Göksun  is a feminine Turkish given name. In Turkish, "Göksun" means "(the one who) rises to the sky".

People

Given name
 Göksun Çam, a Turkish actress.
 Göksun Uzun, a Turkish model and a contestant in Turkey's Next Top Model 1996

Surname
 Hasan Göksun, a Turkish football player currently playing in Gençlik Gücü S.K.

Turkish feminine given names